Marine Fighter Attack Squadron 323 (VMFA-323) is an aircraft carrier-based aviation squadron of the United States Marine Corps. The squadron is equipped with the McDonnell Douglas F/A-18C Hornet and is based at Marine Corps Air Station Miramar, California, United States. It falls under the command of Marine Aircraft Group 11 (MAG-11) and the 3rd Marine Aircraft Wing (3rd MAW) but deploys with the U.S. Navy's Carrier Air Wing 17 (CVW-17). Their tail code is WS and their radio callsign is Snake.

History

World War II
VMF-323 was commissioned August 1, 1943 at Marine Corps Air Station Cherry Point, North Carolina.  According to oral history, the squadron got its name from three fighter pilots who killed a  rattlesnake and hung its skin in the squadron's ready room.  VMF-323 began training in F4U Corsairs almost immediately for combat in the Pacific theater of World War II.  On December 16, 1943 the squadron received orders to prepare to move to the west coast of the United States beginning the first week of January 1944.  Much of the new squadron's training was done at Marine Corps Air Station El Centro and Marine Corps Air Station Camp Pendleton, California. In July 1944, the Death Rattlers departed for the Pacific aboard . For the next nine months, VMF-323 flew training missions from secure island bases in the South Pacific.

Combat operations commenced the following day. Between then and the Japanese surrender in August, the Death Rattlers racked up 124 Japanese planes shot down without a single loss. The highest total of any squadron during the battle. Twelve Death Rattlers became aces.

After the war, the Death Rattlers were based at Marine Corps Air Station El Toro, where they conducted training exercises.  It was around this time that the squadron appeared in the 1949 movie Sands of Iwo Jima.

Korean War and post-war
During action near Kosong, on 11 August 1950, a VMF-323 Corsair pilot, Captain Vivian M. Moses, became the first Marine aviator killed in Korea. Shortly afterward in Feb 1951 VMF-323 was rebased to the K-1 airfield near Pusan. Conditions at K-1 were reportedly harsh, as the squadron was living in tents, had no furniture, and was eating K-Rations in freezing weather. In March, the squadron was transferred officially to Marine Aircraft Group 12 (MAG-12). From April 20th onward the difficult non-hard-surface runway at the K-16 airfield near Seoul was used as a forward operating base for rearming and refueling, while K-1 was used for repair and scheduled maintenance. The squadron replaced its F4U-4Bs with the F4U-4 when it went aboard. Combat operations were flown off the Sicily for a few months. On 20 Sep, the Death Rattlers left the Sicily for Itami, changed back to F4U-4Bs, and rebased again to K-1. On Oct 30th 1951 the squadron was rebased to the K-18 near Kangnung, and on April 21st 1952 rebased to K-6 near Pyeongtaek. The unit also took part in the attack on the Sui-ho Dam in June 1952.

The squadron was re-designated Marine Attack Squadron 323 (VMA-323) in June, 1952. Around this time the 24 aircraft complement was changed to include approximately half F4U-4Bs and half of the more heavily armored ground attack focused AU-1s. The Death Rattlers left Korea in July 1953. VMA-323 was the Marine fixed-wing attack squadron with the longest overseas service during the Korean War, accumulating a total of 48,677 hours of flight time since their August 1950 arrival in Korea. In total, 16 Death Rattlers were Killed In Action (the same number of losses as in WWII) and 4 became POWs.

Once back home, the squadron began flying the F9F Panther and then the F9F Cougar, a swept-wing version of the Panther. In 1956 the squadron adopted the FJ-4 Fury, with which it deployed to the western Pacific in 1957.  That year, the Death Rattlers flew armed patrols over the Quemoy and Matsu islands to support Chinese nationalist forces.

In 1964, the squadron returned to MCAS Cherry Point, where they received their present designation of Marine Fighter Attack Squadron 323 (VMFA-323).  This same year, the Death Rattlers began flying the F-4 Phantom II.  During the Dominican Crisis in 1965, the Death Rattlers provided air cover while American citizens were evacuated.

Vietnam War
As the United States grew closer to war in South Vietnam, the Death Rattlers deployed to Da Nang Air Base beginning on October 25, 1965.  Combat operations started the day after they arrived.  The squadron lost its first aircraft a week after they arrived when the squadron's executive officer was shot down by a surface-to-air missile over North Vietnam.  It was the only Marine F-4 felled by a SAM during the war. The squadron remained in Vietnam until 1969, flying combat sorties from Da Nang and Chu Lai.

1980s to 2001 

The squadron embarked on its only aircraft carrier cruise in the F-4 Phantom in November 1979 aboard . On 24 April 1980, VMFA-323 was prepared to fly combat missions into southern Iran in support of US hostages rescue attempt Operation Eagle Claw with the mission to shoot down any Iranian combat aircraft that attempted to take off. When Operation Eagle Claw failed, VMFA-323 F-4s flew missions around the clock until all US support ships had exited the Persian Gulf and the Gulf of Oman. The squadron was awarded the Presidential Unit Citation for its service. The squadron arrived back at Subic Bay, RP after 102 straight days at sea. 
On 14 September 1982, VMFA-323 transitioned to its current aircraft, the F/A-18 Hornet. In October 1985, the squadron deployed again aboard Coral Sea, this time to the Mediterranean Sea. In spring of 1986 during freedom of navigation exercises held in international waters and airspace off the coast of Libya. On 15 April 1986, the squadron provided SAM suppression and fighter Combat Air Patrol (CAP) sorties during Operation El Dorado Canyon.

In 1994, 1995, 1997, 1999, and 2001 the Death Rattlers flew missions in support of Operation Southern Watch.

Global War on Terror

On 2 November 2002, VMFA-323 deployed aboard  as part of CVW-2 to conduct Operation Southern Watch.  While on this deployment, the Death Rattlers transitioned from Operation Southern Watch to Operation Iraqi Freedom conducting sorties into Baghdad on the first night of the war.

Squadron aces

Miscellaneous Information
 An F-4N Phantom painted with VMFA-323 squadron markings can be seen on the flight deck of the Intrepid Sea-Air-Space Museum.
 Jerry Coleman, then second baseman for the New York Yankees, flew with VMA-323 during the Korean War.

See also

 List of active United States Marine Corps aircraft squadrons
 United States Marine Corps Aviation
 CVW-17

Citations

References

Bibliography

 Chapin, John C. Fire Brigade: U.S. Marines in the Pusan Perimeter. Washington, D.C.: Marine Corps Historical Center, 2000.

 
 Pitzl, Gerald R. A History of Marine fighter Attack Squadron 323. Washington, D.C.: Marine Corps Historical Center, 1987.

 Wolf, William. Death Rattlers: Marine Squadron VMF-323 over Okinawa. Atglen, Pennsylvania: Schiffer Publishing, 1999. .

External links

 
 323 Death Rattlers
 VMFA: Death Rattlers Afloat - Naval Aviation News (July–August 2003)

 Oral history interview with Alfred Palombizio, a member of the "Death Rattlers" during World War II from the Veterans History Project at Central Connecticut State University
 A History of Marine Fighter Attack Squadron 323: By Gerald R. Pitzl, 1987

Fighter attack squadrons of the United States Marine Corps
FS0323